Raaste Kaa Patthar is a 1972 Indian Hindi-language comedy drama film directed by Mukul Dutt. The film stars Amitabh Bachchan, Shatrughan Sinha and Prem Chopra. The movie is loosely based on the 1960 movie The Apartment.

Cast 
 Amitabh Bachchan as Jaishankar Rai
 Neeta Khayani as Neeta Sinha
 Shatrughan Sinha as Arun Thakur
 Laxmi Chhaya as Tanu Thakur
 Prem Chopra as Ranjeet Choudhary
 Asit Sen as Golbadan Chaturvedi
 Satyendra Kapoor as Mr. Kapoor
 Bhagwan as Constable Bhagwan
 Trilok Kapoor
 Asrani as 
 Chand Usmani as Mrs. Chaudhary
 Mohan Choti as D'Souza
 Viju Khote as Doctor
 Shivraj as Ahmed

Soundtrack
All songs were written by Anand Bakshi.

References

External links
 

1972 films
Indian comedy-drama films
1970s Hindi-language films
1972 comedy-drama films
Films scored by Laxmikant–Pyarelal
Indian remakes of American films